Belgium competed at the 1964 Summer Olympics in Tokyo, Japan. 61 competitors, 60 men and 1 woman, took part in 36 events in 13 sports.

Medalists

Gold
 Gaston Roelants — Athletics, Men's 3,000 m Steeplechase
 Patrick Sercu — Cycling, Men's 1,000 m Time Trial

Bronze
 Walter Godefroot — Cycling, Men's Individual Road Race

Athletics

Canoeing

Cycling

Ten cyclists represented Belgium in 1964.

Individual road race
 Walter Godefroot 
 Eddy Merckx 
 Roger Swerts 
 Jozef Boons

Team time trial
 Leopold Heuvelmans
 Roland de Neve
 Roland Van De Rijse
 Albert Van Vlierberghe

Sprint
 Patrick Sercu

1000m time trial
 Patrick Sercu

Individual pursuit
 Herman Van Loo

Team pursuit
 Leopold Heuvelmans
 Roland de Neve
 Roland Van De Rijse
 Albert Van Vlierberghe

Fencing

Two fencers, both men, represented Belgium in 1964.

Men's épée
 René Van Den Driessche

Men's sabre
 Yves Brasseur

Gymnastics

Hockey

Rowing

Sailing

Shooting

One shooter represented Belgium in 1964.

50 m rifle, three positions
 Frans Lafortune

50 m rifle, prone
 Frans Lafortune

Swimming

Water polo

Weightlifting

Wrestling

References

External links

Official Olympic Reports
International Olympic Committee results database

Nations at the 1964 Summer Olympics
1964
Olympics